Gibb, Livingston & Co., known in Chinese as Jinkee or Renji, was one of the most important and best-known foreign trading firms in China in the late 19th and the first half of the 20th century.

Gibb, Livingston & Co. was established on 1July 1836 in Canton (Guangzhou), by two Scotsmen, Thomas Augustus Gibb and William Potter Livingston, who were originally employees of the British East India Company.  and moved to Macao during the First Opium War. It opened the first office at Queen's Road, Hong Kong when the island was ceded to the British as a colony. In 1844 John Darby Gibb opened a branch in Shanghai at the Cadastral Lot No. 2. on Jinkee Road (now ) which was named after the firm. A branch later opened at Fuzhou mainly for the tea trade and from which the firm's clippers operated. Its office in Hong Kong was located at the York's Buildings and in 1855, its senior partner Hugh Gibb, who was later chairman of the Hong Kong General Chamber of Commerce and a member of the Legislative Council of Hong Kong. The principal trade of the firm in its early days were export of tea and imports of cottons and woolens as well as trade in opium.

The firm was the agent for many companies in different places in China including Shanghai Land Investment Company, China Fire Insurance Company, North British and Mercantile Fire Insurance Company, "Allianz" Vers.

Gibb, Livingston & Co was also the agent for the Ben Line of Steamers and the Eastern and Australian Steamship Company in Shanghai, Hong Kong, and Fuzhou.

In 1962, Gibb, Livingston & Co. was purchased by the Borneo Company Limited, itself later acquired by Inchcape plc in 1967. Currently owned by SZE K Y Foundation Fund in Hong Kong since 2005.

See also

 Hong (business)
 List of trading companies

References

Footnote citations

Companies established in 1836
Companies disestablished in 1962
Trading companies
Conglomerate companies of Hong Kong
British Hong Kong
Defunct companies of Hong Kong
History of foreign trade in China
1836 establishments in China
Defunct companies of China
Companies based in Guangzhou